The SIU Edwardsville Cougars men's basketball team represents Southern Illinois University Edwardsville (SIUE) in the Ohio Valley Conference of NCAA Division I basketball. The Cougars play their home matches at the Sam M. Vadalabene Center located in the SIUE core campus in Edwardsville, Illinois.

History
The SIUE basketball program first entered competition on  November 23, 1967 under the leadership of Naismith Memorial Basketball Hall of Fame coach Harry Gallatin. The newborn program had no scholarships, inadequate facilities, and very little money to work with. Home games were played at the Shurtleff College gymnasium in Alton, usually with crowds of fewer than a dozen fans in attendance. Gallatin departed as the program's coach after three years (while remaining as athletic director and golf coach for many years) with a record of 19–31.

Gallatin was succeeded by Jim Dudley, who would head the program for eleven years, compiling a 146–143 record. During Dudley's tenure, home games moved to the gymnasium at Edwardsville High School (now Lincoln Middle School) which was located a short distance from the SIUE campus.

Dudley was followed by Tom Pugliese, whose two years saw a record of 17–40 and brought about NCAA sanctions, resulting in the university administration's almost unheard of action of suspending of the program for the 1983–84 season.

Larry Graham resurrected the program in 1984, as the program finally got a home of its own, moving into the new Sam M. Vadalabene Center on campus.  Graham was the most successful of the Cougars' coaches, earning a record of 147–84, with three NCAA Division II tournament appearances in his eight seasons.

After Graham, Jack Margenthaler had limited success, achieving a record of 112–150 in ten years.

Success returned to Cougars basketball during Marty Simmons' five years at the helm.  Simmons's teams went 88–59, making the NCAA Division II tournament in 2005 and not only returning in 2006, but earning a spot in that season's Elite Eight in Springfield, Massachusetts.

When Simmons returned to his alma mater, as head coach at the University of Evansville, SIUE named long-time Missouri Valley Conference assistant coach Lennox Forrester to be the programs' seventh head coach.  Following his first season, the Cougars began the transition from Division II to Division I and membership in the Ohio Valley Conference. Although the Cougars had losing seasons during their transition, they have become more competitive with each season.  Through Forrester's first five seasons, his teams finished only 50–92, but his contract was extended following the 2011–12 season.

On March 10, 2015, it was announced that the contracts of Forrester  and his entire staff would not be renewed and that a national search for a new head coach was being launched. On April 3, it was announced that California assistant coach Jon Harris, an Edwardsville native, had been named the 8th head coach in SIUE Basketball history.

On March 11, 2019, SIUE announced that coach Jon Harris' contract had not been renewed after a four-year record of 31 wins and 88 losses. However, Harris' full staff of assistant coaches Brian Barone, Charles "Bubba" Wells, and Mike Waldo and Director of Operations Casey Wyllie were all retained, and Barone was later named as interim head coach.

After serving as the interim head coach throughout the 2019 offseason, Barone was officially named head coach of the Cougars on November 13th 2019 after a 1-2 start to the season.

The Cougars have improved steadily over the first three years of Barone's tenure as head coach, posting win totals of eight in 2019-20, nine in 2020-21 and 11 in 2021-22. The 2020-21  and 2021-22 seasons were both affected heavily by the COVID-19 pandemic. This began with the team's December 13th game at Northwestern cancelled. The Cougars returned to play with a 69-65 win over Morehead State to open OVC play on December 18, however, it would be the last game SIUE would play for 33 days. Following the game against Morehead State, the Cougars had nine consecutive games postponed due to a COVID-19 outbreak on the team. SIUE would go on to play 18 games in 37 days to finish the season. SIUE qualified for the OVC Tournament, losing their opening round game to Belmont 78-61. The following year, SIUE had five games postponed due to COVID-19 concerns, once again qualifying for the OVC Tournament. SIUE lost its first-round matchup to Tennessee State.

All-Americans
Reference:

While the SIUE men's basketball has not seen the success of some other Cougars programs, two players were honored as NCAA Division II All-Americans:

Keith McFarland 1974–75
John Edwards 1986–87

Postseason

NCAA Division II tournament results
The Cougars appeared in the NCAA Division II Tournament five times. Their combined record is 6–5.

Record By Year
Reference

References

External links